Lincoln Park Zoo, also known as Lincoln Park Zoological Gardens, is a  zoo in Lincoln Park, Chicago, Illinois. The zoo was founded in 1868, making it the fourth oldest zoo in North America. It is also one of a few free admission zoos in all of North America.  The zoo is an accredited member of the Association of Zoos and Aquariums (AZA).

Lincoln Park Zoo is home to a wide variety of animals. The zoo's exhibits include big cats, polar bears, penguins, gorillas, reptiles, monkeys, and other species totaling about 1,100 animals from some 200 species. Also located in Lincoln Park Zoo is a burr oak tree which dates to 1830, three years before the city of Chicago was organized.

History

The zoo was founded in 1868, when the Lincoln Park Commissioners were given a gift of two pairs of swans by Central Park's Board of Commissioners in New York City.  Other animals were soon donated to the park, including, a puma, two elk, three wolves, four eagles, and eight peacock. In 1874, a bear cub from the Philadelphia Zoo was the first animal purchased by the zoo, for US$10. The bear became quite adept at escaping from its home and could frequently be found roaming Lincoln Park at night.  In 1884, reportedly the first American bison born in captivity was born at the Lincoln Park Zoo. At this time, the species had been hunted almost to extinction in the wild—in 1896, the United States government purchased one bull and seven cows from the Zoo's bison herd to send to Yellowstone National Park to assist in the species' revival.

From 1888 to 1919 the director of the Lincoln Park Zoo was the flamboyant Cy DeVry, who organized the collection, built many new structures, and obtained the zoo's first elephant and monkeys. A new Lion House opened in 1912. It was later renovated and reopened in 1990. The Primate House opened in 1927, and it was known for housing a popular gorilla named Bushman (1931–1951), one of the only gorillas in a U. S. zoo at the time.  From 1920 until a Zoo expansion in 1994, the 1893 World's Fair Viking ship was located at the zoo. The zoo's great apes were moved to the Lester E. Fisher Great Ape House in 1976, named for the zoo's outgoing director, and the original Primate House was later renovated and reopened in 1992 as the Helen Brach Primate House, featuring more naturalistic settings.

Marlin Perkins, who gained fame as the host of the television program Zoo Parade, and later Wild Kingdom, was director of the zoo from 1944 until 1962. He created and recruited a citizens group, the Lincoln Park Zoological Society, to support the Zoo's mission. The facility underwent a dramatic transformation in the 1970s and 1980s, with the additions of many new, naturalistic exhibits. In 1995, the Zoological Society assumed management of the zoo from the Chicago Park District, which remains the owner.  Zoo administration is currently housed in the nearby building previously used by the Chicago Academy of Sciences, which moved to a new facility in 1999. The Kovler Sea Lion Pool opened the same year after an extensive renovation, and it is now home to the zoo's harbor seals.

Regenstein African Journey, a renovation of the zoo's former Large Mammal House, opened in 2003, turning the zoo's largest building from concrete showcases for a few large mammals into a series of naturalistic settings that tell the story of the wildlife of the African continent, welcoming the return of the zoo's African elephants and giraffes as well as new additions such as the aardvark, ostrich, and African wild dog. Two years later, the zoo renovated its Great Ape House, opening the Regenstein Center for African Apes, which focused on the zoo's troops of common chimpanzees and western lowland gorillas, putting a special emphasis on researching the behaviors of both species and creating new, naturalistic habitats.

In 2003, the book The Ark in the Park: The Story of Lincoln Park Zoo was also published by the University of Illinois Press. The book was written by Mark Rosenthal, Carol Tauber, and Edward Uhlir.

In 2010, Lincoln Park Zoo transformed the adjacent South Pond to create the Nature Boardwalk, an ecological habitat designed by Studio Gang Architects that features native wetlands plants and wildlife.

In December 2011, the Kovler Penguin-Seabird House, which had previously been home to rockhopper, king penguins, common murres and puffins closed down after thirty years at the zoo due to worries about the deteriorating condition of the building, prompting outcry from some Chicago residents. It was soon announced it would be replaced with a newly renovated West Gate, featuring a children's train and an all-new exhibit, Regenstein Macaque Forest, featuring Japanese macaques, or "snow monkeys", in a state-of-the-art exhibit with a hot spring, set to open in fall 2014.

It was announced in March 2014 that the zoo's Robert R. McCormick Bear Habitat, or "Bear Line", would be torn down and rebuilt with a large and significantly improved habitat for the zoo's lone polar bear, with much more land area for the bears and a behind-the-scenes den for breeding.  The new exhibit would also feature a new African penguin habitat, a new species for the zoo from the tropical coasts of Africa, enabling them to stand the zoo's harsh summers as well as its cold winters. This exhibit would also be fully outdoors and equipped for over a dozen penguins with a behind-the-scenes breeding area. Construction began after the opening of Regenstein Macaque Forest in fall 2014, with Robert and Mayari Pritzker Penguin Cove opening in late 2016.

In 2016, the Zoo announced the Pride of Chicago fundraising campaign, which sought $125 million in funding, and lead to the construction of Regenstein Macaque Forest, Robert and Mayari Pritzker Penguin Cove and Walter Family Arctic Tundra, would conclude with a long-awaited $30 million renovation of the aging Kovler Lion House as part of the Pride of Chicago fundraising campaign, acknowledging the public perception problems with the exhibit, which had been constrained by its Historic Landmark status during previous renovations, most recently in 1992. The new exhibit opened in late 2021 and focuses squarely on lions as opposed to other big cat species it had previously held, such as tigers .

Programming
The zoo together with technological help from the Adler Planetarium is aiming to expand its survey of Chicago area wildlife with public assistance at an interactive website, Zooniverse.  The zoo has positioned motion sensing cameras in the Chicago area to catch images of wildlife, and the public is asked to help identify the animals.

The Zoo operates a number of youth-focused programs including a number of year-round camps, facilitated school program field trips, and a number of community engagement initiatives that prioritize the Little Village and North Lawndale communities. Both the Little Village and North Lawndale outreach programs include community gardening programs that focus on creating green spaces in Chicago and on promoting healthy eating habits. 

Like many other zoos and aquariums nationally, Lincoln Park Zoo adapted many of their programs to the digital format during the COVID-19 pandemic. This included creating modified versions of their local program offerings, such as running their Artecito program, which connects Little Village families with nature through the arts, in conjunction with the OPEN Center for the Arts through free biweekly programs.

Exhibits
The zoo's collection totals nearly 1,100 animals.

Walter Family Arctic Tundra
Redeveloped from the former Robert R. McCormick Bear Habitat in the zoo's northeast corner, Walter Family Arctic Tundra is a new exhibit for the zoo's polar bears, larger than the previous habitat with more land for the bears to roam on; instead of strict rockwork, there is natural grass, a new underwater viewing area, a maternity den, and enough space to support a small breeding family of bears.

Polar bear

Robert and Mayari Pritzker Penguin Cove
Linked to the nearby Regenstein African Journey, Penguin Cove is a new outdoor African penguin exhibit, where visitors can watch as these tropical penguins dive into the water, with a behind-the-scenes area for hatching chicks and breeding the species. The zoo also offers indoor Penguin Encounters. The exhibit opened to the public in October 2016.

African penguin

Regenstein Macaque Forest
Opened in 2014, Macaque Forest is an exhibit allowing guests to connect with a troop of 10-15 Japanese macaques in a camouflaged forest scene with views from both above and eye-level with the animals. The exhibit features a "hot spring", a trademark favorite of the species, which allows them to warm up in the winter and amuse guests. It also functions as a dedicated research station for the macaques. It is the zoo's third exhibit to house primates.

Japanese macaque

Regenstein African Journey

The Regenstein African Journey exhibit is a 60,000-square-foot indoor-and-outdoor exhibit which opened in May 2003 on the site of the zoo's former Regenstein Large Mammal House.  It simulates four distinct habitats from the African continent. Large skylights permit natural light into the indoor area, and guests are greeted quickly by monkeys in a rainforest setting as they enter Africa. The second section focuses on African rivers, with massive glass panels for hybrid land/water exhibits for West African dwarf crocodiles, pygmy hippos, and a Lake Malawi cichlid tank with an 11,000-lb., 7-in.-thick glass panel. The third section, focused on the African savanna, featured habitats for a large group of meerkats, a space for the zoo's aardvarks, and an indoor habitat for the giraffes. The fourth and final section simulates African kopje habitats, with klipspringer antelopes hopping along the way.

The main outdoor exhibit is a large, expansive African savanna setting just outside the indoor exhibit exit that primarily houses the zoo's giraffes. There is also a large yard for a family of African painted dogs, a hog yard that has been used by both common warthogs and currently red river hogs, and multiple yards for the zoo's black rhinos. While many of these animals cannot be viewed indoors, they have access to indoor habitats year-round.

When the exhibit opened, it was also home to three African bush elephants, but they died, the last one dying at Hogle Zoo in 2005, sparking concerns about the exhibit. It later briefly held Bactrian camels, but it is currently an additional home for the zoo's rhinos.

One noted resident of the exhibit was R1 (or Reptile One) the dwarf crocodile, who was seventy years old when he died in 2010, having lived within the zoo's Reptile House (now Park Place Café), the Regenstein Small Mammal-Reptile House, and finally, Regenstein African Journey throughout his life.

Aardvark
Abdim's stork
African spoonbill
African wild dog
Blue-bellied roller
Blue-billed teal
Crested guineafowl
Diana monkey
Dwarf crocodile
Eastern black rhinoceros
Giraffe
Golden silk spider
Hadada ibis
Klipspringer
Madagascar hissing cockroach
Meerkat
Northern red-billed hornbill
Plains zebra
Pygmy hippopotamus
Red river hog

Regenstein Center for African Apes
Lincoln Park Zoo's dedication to primate research continued when the Lester E. Fisher Great Ape House was closed and rebuilt with a new focus on the two African ape species, the chimpanzee and western lowland gorilla. The new center, opened in 2005, has over 29,000 square feet of indoor and outdoor living space for three ape troops, featuring dozens of trees, artificial vines, real and simulated bamboo, as well as skylights, waterfalls, moats, heated logs, and termite mounds for chimpanzees to illustrate their knowledge of tools to 'fish' for termites in their mounds. The exhibit has three spacious habitats – the 12,000-square-foot Kovler Gorilla Bamboo Forest, an open-air habitat with a moat around it, dedicated to the zoo's main gorilla troop. Two additional exhibits - the Strangler Fig Forest and Dry Riverbed Valley - each with mesh netting to secure the animals, can accommodate either chimpanzees or gorillas. Huge glass panels give guests nose-to-nose access with the zoo's apes both in the trees and on the ground. The exhibit also contains the Lester E. Fisher Center for the Study and Conservation of Apes, which encourages zoo guests to engage in research and scientific development to conserve apes in the wild.

Notable residents of this exhibit include Kwan, the current silverback in the zoo's gorilla troupe who appeared in the film "Return to Me" as Sidney, a chimpanzee named Optimus Prime, after the fictional character of the same name, and formerly Keo, the oldest male chimpanzee in a North American zoo at the time of his death in September 2013 at fifty-five. Custom-made stuffed animals of Kwan and Optimus in their likenesses are available in the zoo's Wild Things gift shop.

Chimpanzee
Western lowland gorilla

Pritzker Family Children's Zoo
The new Pritzker Family Children's Zoo, which opened in 2004, features a number of native eastern American wildlife, and lets visitors of all ages connect with the wild creatures in our own backyard and engages them to think about how species survive in the wilderness. Small amphibians and reptiles are featured in a small indoor exhibit, along with a leaf-themed climber play area for youngsters designed by Tom Luckey, with slightly larger indoor exhibits for birds and reptiles and large glass windows on each end so guests young and old can watch American beavers and the popular North American river otters swim gracefully underwater at eye-level in their outdoor habitats, with educational displays about how beavers build dams. Outside the building there are many areas where local birds nest. The building is surrounded by small outdoor viewing areas for the same otter and beaver habitatss.

There are two significantly larger exhibits surrounding the path around the building for the black bear and the endangered red wolf featuring heavy foliage and a naturalistic stream, allowing visitors to go eye-to-eye with the animals or for the animals to hide in the foliage. Statues of gray wolves and signs encourage guests to practice howling and teach them about wolf pack dynamics.

American black bear
American green tree frog
American toad
Blanding's turtle
Common walkingstick
Eastern box turtle
Eastern screech owl
Midland painted turtle
North American beaver
North American river otter
Red wolf
Spotted turtle
Wood turtle

Kovler Seal Pool

One of the zoo's most popular exhibits since its first iteration in 1879, the Kovler Seal Pool is one of oldest and most popular exhibits at Lincoln Park Zoo, and remains a favorite among zoo guests. The exhibit was renovated most recently in May 1999 in hopes of creating a habitat that most resembles their natural environment in the wild. There are three main viewing areas - from behind a fence in front of the tank on the main zoo path, an amphitheater-style seating area above the tank on the opposite end, and an underwater viewing gallery where visitors can watch the seals glide through the water. Signage around the exhibit teaches guests how to tell seals and sea lions apart. The zoo's pinnipeds are trained voluntarily twice a day, and given fish treats as rewards. Though multiple species of seal and sea lion have lived in the pool together in the past, since May 2013 it has been home only to gray and harbor seals.

Gray seal
Harbor seal

Regenstein Small Mammal-Reptile House
The Regenstein Small Mammal-Reptile House is a  indoor exhibit that opened in 1997 and houses small animals in two main areas: the Gallery and the Ecosystem. The Gallery begins with a large room ringed with terrariums exhibiting reptiles and amphibians. The next part of the Gallery features small mammals in and around a man-made baobab tree trunk. The building continues in the Ecosystem, a geodesic dome  in height that simulates the world's tropical rainforests. The Ecosystem begins with a series of stream exhibits for caimans and otters, and continues with mixed-species exhibits for arboreal species like primates,.

Mammals
Asian small-clawed otter
Brush-tailed bettong
Cactus mouse
Common dwarf mongoose
Egyptian fruit bat
Fennec fox
Golden-headed lion tamarin
Mohol bushbaby
Naked mole-rat
Prehensile-tailed porcupine
Pygmy slow loris
Southern three-banded armadillo
White-faced saki

Reptiles
Aruba island rattlesnake
Central African rock python
Spectacled caiman
Great Plains rat snake
Green tree python
Henkel's leaf-tailed gecko
Jamaican iguana
Kenyan sand boa
Leopard gecko
Madagascar tree boa
Massasauga
Northern blue-tongued skink
Oriente knight anole
Prehensile-tailed skink
Red-footed tortoise
Rio Fuerte beaded lizard
Spectacled caiman
West African Gaboon viper
Yellow-spotted river turtle

Amphibians
Oriental fire-bellied toad
Solomon Islands leaf frog

Fish
Red devil cichlid
White blotched river stingray

Birds
Puerto Rican parrot

Invertebrates
Carlsbad green tarantula

Regenstein Birds of Prey Exhibit
This popular outdoor exhibit near McCormick Bird House allows visitors to observe powerful birds-of-prey through stunning outdoor aviaries that give them plenty of room to spread their wings or to perch on rocks or tree branches in their enclosures. These exhibits emphasize how birds-of-prey play a role as "nature's clean-up crew". One large, lush outdoor habitat contains multiple specimens, including breeding pairs of cinereous vultures and white stork, while two adjacent aviaries contain the zoo's resident bald eagle and the next features a snowy owl next door. A baby vulture was born at the zoo in June 2013 but was abandoned by its parents and had to be hand-reared and reintroduced gradually.

Bald eagle
Cinereous vulture
Snowy owl
White stork

Helen Brach Primate House
The zoo's historic Primate House first opened in 1927, featuring apes and monkeys from different locations and habitats in a series of small, identical barred cages typical of most early zoo exhibits. It became famous for its apes, including a gorilla named Bushman, until the Great Ape House opened. The Primate House's interior was heavily renovated in the early 1990s and it was re-opened as the Helen Brach Primate House in 1992 with eight diorama-style naturalistic exhibits simulating the swamps and rainforests of the animals' natural habitats in the wild. Perhaps its most notable residents are a family of white-cheeked gibbons that have a spacious room inside as well as an outdoor habitat for playing in the warm winter months. The zoo's male and female gibbons gave birth to baby Daxin on August 16, 2013.

Crowned lemurs joined the exhibit in October 2013 from the Indianapolis Zoo and a baby lemur was born at the zoo on April 14, 2014.

Allen's swamp monkey
Black-and-white colobus monkey
Bolivian gray titi monkey
Crowned lemur
De Brazza's monkey
François' langur
Hoffmann's two-toed sloth
Northern white-cheeked gibbon
Pied tamarin
Southern black howler monkey

McCormick Bird House
One of the zoo's most historic buildings, the McCormick Bird House was first designed in 1904 under Cyrus DeVry, the zoo's original director. It has been redesigned multiple times, most recently in 1991, and is currently home to multiple habitats recreating the tropics, savanna, sea shore, desert, wetlands, and other biomes, with a tropical free-flight aviary allowing guests to become immersed with perching and aquatic birds without fences or glass. Some of the zoo's most notable birds include the famous laughing kookaburra in the scrub display, multiple scarlet ibis specimens in its swamp display and the Bali myna, a critically endangered bird that Lincoln Park Zoo breeds, while also maintaining the species' studbook. Thirty-one mynahs have been born at the zoo since 1972, with the most recent set of chicks being born in mid-2012.

Abdim's stork
American avocet
Asian fairy-bluebird
Baer's pochard
Bali myna
Black-necked stilt
Blue-crowned laughingthrush
Blue-crowned motmot
Blue-faced honeyeater
Blue-grey tanager
Bourke's parrot
Chinese hwamei
Collared finchbill
Crested wood partridge
Emerald starling
Golden-breasted starling
Green broadbill
Guam kingfisher
Guira cuckoo
Hamerkop
Helmeted curassow
Inca tern
Jambu fruit dove
Kagu
Laughing kookaburra
Luzon bleeding-heart
Mandarin duck
Masked lapwing
Nicobar pigeon
Palawan peacock-pheasant
Red-billed leiothrix
Red-capped cardinal
Scarlet ibis
Snowy-crowned robin-chat
Snowy egret
Spotted thick-knee
Sunbittern
Taveta weaver
Tawny frogmouth
Victoria crowned pigeon
Violet turaco
White-headed buffalo weaver
White-lined tanager
White-rumped shama

Camel & Zebra Area
The zoo's familiar four-acre Camel & Zebra Area, built in 1982 on the south end of the main zoo, is an oval-shaped series of large grassland exhibits that house the zoo's diverse hoofstock and miscellaneous animals. During construction on Regenstein African Journey, it held the zoo's future Grant's gazelle collection. The Antelope & Zebra Area has historically held several species, including the Arabian oryx, as part of the animals' complex Species Survival Plan, and briefly a pair of sable antelope in 2011. The most recent additions, however, are the waterbuck from Africa and a rarity in an American zoo, the endangered Sichuan takin.

The zoo has been successful with breeding the Sichuan takin - two baby takin were born together at the zoo in January and February 2013 and were named Xing Fu ("happy good fortune") and Mengyao ("superior handsomeness") after a poll on the Lincoln Park Zoo website. A baby kangaroo was born December 9, 2013 and later named Jack by nine-year-old Olivia Holness of Chicago.

Bactrian camel
Chacoan peccary
Common ostrich
Grévy's zebra
Père David's deer 
Red kangaroo
Sichuan takin

Waterfowl Lagoon
A sizable lagoon for waterfowl features the zoo's familiar flock of almost fifty Chilean flamingos, who use the exhibit's mudflaps to build nests and use the indoor Flamingo Habitat, sometimes referred to as the Flamingo Dome, during the winter to hide from the cold. It is also home to swan geese.

Chilean flamingo
Swan goose

Hope B. McCormick Swan Pond
Lincoln Park Zoo began with the gift of a pair of swans, and to commemorate its founding and that special moment in history, a pair of trumpeter swans have continued to make their home at the zoo, now in the Hope B. McCormick Swan Pond, as a reminder of the zoo's long history. Several diverse species of waterfowl call this pond home.

Barrow's goldeneye
Hooded merganser
Northern pintail
Ruddy duck
Trumpeter swan

Farm-in-the-Zoo
The Farm-in-the-Zoo Presented by John Deere is across the South Pond from the rest of the zoo, and is designed to "give Chicago Kids a chance to experience a bit of the country in the city." Opened in 1964, it exhibits pigs, cows, horses and other domestic animals. Visitors can pet and feed the animals and roam vegetable gardens. Each day, the cows are milked in public and staff are on hand to explain other elements of farm life. Interactive exhibits allow guests to "hatch" from an egg, learn about farm weather, and about gardening.

Chicken
Cattle
Domestic rabbit
Goat
Pig
Pony
Western honey bee

Pepper Family Wildlife Center
A historic zoo landmark first built in 1912, the Kovler Lion House building stands at the heart of the zoo near its entrance, and has housed a variety of big cat species over the years, most notably many lions as well as Siberian tigers, which inhabited two grottos on the northern exterior of the building, each having access to multiple indoor areas alongside the interior main hall, and a glass window viewing areas on the end of each grotto for guests to get a closer view. Other big cats, such as the jaguar, were allowed rotating access to two to three indoor window exhibits at a time. The southern exterior included five lush habitats that housed a variety of different cat species over the years. In addition, they also held a pair of red pandas, which were part of the Species Survival Plan. The indoor area also has a large gift shop where visitors can purchase plush toys of big cats, bears, and other animals.

Many of the species in the southern habitats shifted over the years, including Amur leopards, Eurasian lynxes, a Pallas's cat, and a puma in the exhibit's later years, with the last major addition being a one-year-old snow leopard named Taza who arrived on December 11, 2014.

One of the exhibit's notable residents was Adelor the African lion, who lived at the zoo from 1995 until his death in February 2012 and was one of the zoo's most popular animals. Upon his death, an anonymous donor paid for a statue of Adelor which now stands at the East Gate. He was succeeded by a male lion named Sahar, who turned four in January 2014. Another notable individual was a beloved black leopard, Marta, who was euthanized due to kidney problems in 2010. The zoo was also once known for having some of the only Asiatic lions in the United States, but these were later found to have received African-Asian hybrids.

In 2016, the zoo announced a $30 million renovation of the habitat as part of the Pride of Chicago fundraising campaign, acknowledging the public perception problems of the historic building, and confirming that the focus would be a more naturalistic space for African lions, along with spaces for the Canada lynx, Snow leopards, and red pandas. The exhibit closed in 2019 for the renovation and reopened as the Pepper Family Wildlife Center in the fall of 2021.

On March 15/16, 2022, a male lion cub was born following a 3  to 4-month gestation period. The cub is named Pilipili, meaning Pepper in Swahili language, and he is the offspring of lioness Zari and male Jabari. It was the zoo's first lion cub birth in 20 years.

African lion
Canada lynx 
Red panda
Snow leopard

Bear Habitat
The Robert R. McCormick Bear Habitat, or "Bear Line", sat directly next to Regenstein African Journey, and housed many carnivores over the years in a number of naturalistic exhibits with trees, water falls, rocky grottos and climbing structures for bears and wolves to use. At the north end is the 266,000-gallon polar bear pool and underwater window, one of the largest polar bear habitats in the world. The zoo received two polar bears, brother and sister Lee and Anana, in 2001, but currently only Anana remains, as Lee was sent to the Detroit Zoo to assist in a breeding program. The only other remaining member of the bear line is a single Malayan sun bear. The zoo was also home to two elderly spectacled bears, Goliath and Manny that have since been sent to another zoo, as have the spotted hyenas. The exhibit used to house the maned wolf and Mexican wolf but both species were removed when the Pritzer Family Children's Zoo opened its own red wolf habitat in 2005.

The exhibit closed in winter 2014 as work began on the new polar bear and penguin habitats over the same site. The habitat re-opened in late 2016.

Penguin-Seabird Exhibit
First opened in 1981/1982, the zoo's historic Aquatic Bird House featured two main theater-style galleries. The first featured three species of penguin - the rockhopper, chinstrap and king penguins, all in an 18,000-gallon, temperature-controlled pool, with a chilly temperature of around forty degrees Fahrenheit for the air and water, while a computer system imitates the natural daylight cycle penguins experience in the wild. The second gallery featured tufted puffins, common murres and razorbills swimming in a 10,000-gallon pool based on the North Atlantic coast, where the birds made their homes on rocky cliffs. The historic building closed on December 5, 2011, and has been replaced with Regenstein Macaque Forest. The sixty-six birds that lived in the previous exhibit were moved to eleven other locations, including the Shedd Aquarium, the St. Louis Zoo, the Detroit Zoo, the Central Park Zoo and the Oregon Coast Aquarium A new African penguin habitat was built by the current site of the Robert McCormick Bear Habitat, and opened in 2016.

See also
 List of museums and cultural institutions in Chicago

Notes

External links

Chicago Wildlife Watch interactive public research

1868 establishments in Illinois
Zoos in Illinois
Tourist attractions in Chicago
Articles containing video clips
Zoos established in 1868